Christ's Resurrection Church is a Roman Catholic garrison church in Brzeg, in the Opole Voivodeship. The church belongs to the deanery of the Polish Land Forces of the Military Ordinariate of Poland.

The church is a former cemetery chapel, whose present building dates back to 1724. In the past, the chapel was named after the Holy Cross. The chapel is in the Baroque architectural style.

See also
Brzeg Castle
St. Jadwiga's Church, Brzeg
St. Nicholas' Church, Brzeg

References

Brzeg County
Brzeg